Mélanie Suchet (born 1 September 1976) is a French former alpine skier who competed in the 1994 Winter Olympics, 1998 Winter Olympics, and 2002 Winter Olympics.

External links
 sports-reference.com

1976 births
Living people
French female alpine skiers
Olympic alpine skiers of France
Alpine skiers at the 1994 Winter Olympics
Alpine skiers at the 1998 Winter Olympics
Alpine skiers at the 2002 Winter Olympics
Place of birth missing (living people)